Antonina Vasilyevna Nezhdanova (– 26 June 1950), was a Russian and Soviet coloratura soprano.

In 1899, she entered the Moscow Conservatory. Upon her graduation three years later she joined the Bolshoi Theatre, rapidly becoming its leading soprano. She often sang, too, at the Mariinsky Theatre in Saint Petersburg and also in Kyiv and Odessa. Paris heard her in 1912, when she appeared opposite the tenor Enrico Caruso and the great baritone, Titta Ruffo.

Nezhdanova was the dedicatee of Sergei Rachmaninoff's Vocalise, and she was the first performer of the arrangement for soprano and orchestra, with Serge Koussevitzky conducting. She created a number of operatic roles. After the Russian Revolution she stayed on at the Bolshoi, unlike some of her fellow opera singers, who left their native country for the West. In 1936, she began to teach singing in Moscow and was appointed a professor at the city's conservatory in 1943.

She was married to the conductor Nikolai Golovanov and died in Moscow in 1950.

Nezhdanova made a number of recordings that display the beauty and flexibility of her voice and the excellence of her technique. She is considered by opera historians and critics to have been one of the finest sopranos of the 20th century.

References

1873 births
1950 deaths

People from Odesa Oblast
Moscow Conservatory alumni
Academic staff of Moscow Conservatory
Honored Artists of the RSFSR
People's Artists of the RSFSR
People's Artists of the USSR
Stalin Prize winners
Recipients of the Order of Lenin
Recipients of the Order of the Red Banner of Labour
Opera singers from the Russian Empire
Sopranos from the Russian Empire

Music educators from the Russian Empire

Soviet music educators
Soviet sopranos
Soviet women opera singers
Burials at Novodevichy Cemetery